St. Mary is a Roman Catholic church in Bethel, Connecticut, part of the  Diocese of Bridgeport.

History

St. Mary was founded by Irish immigrants in 1882. The first St. Mary Church was designed shortly thereafter by well known church architect James Murphy of Providence RI. Over time it became evident that size of the church was not adequate for the needs of the parish and in 1992 the building was replaced by a larger, modern church designed by Warren and Comacchini  of New York.

Religious Education 
The church focuses on welcoming and encouraging parents to help their children in their faith and states that children of the parish should attend formal religious education to prepare them for their Sacraments of Initiation.

References

External links 
 St Mary - website
 Diocese of Bridgeport

Roman Catholic churches in Connecticut
James Murphy (architect) buildings
Roman Catholic churches completed in 1882
Roman Catholic churches completed in 1992
Buildings and structures in Bethel, Connecticut
Churches in Fairfield County, Connecticut
19th-century Roman Catholic church buildings in the United States